Pyramidelloides mirandus is a species of minute sea snail, a marine gastropod mollusk or micromollusk in the family Eulimidae.

Description

Distribution
This marine species occurs in the Red Sea, the Indian Ocean, the Western Pacific; off Taiwan, Japan and Australia (Northern Territory, Queensland and Western Australia)

References

 Adams, A. 1861. On some new genera and species of Mollusca from the North of China and Japan. Annals and Magazine of Natural History 3 8: 239-246 
 Deshayes, G.P. 1863. Catalogue des Mollusques de l'Île de la Réunion (Bourbon). Annexe E in Maillard, L. (ed.). Notes sur l'isle de La Réunion. Paris : Dentu. [63
 Issel, A. 1869. Malacologia del Mar Rosso. Richerche zoologische e paleontologiche. Pisa : Biblioteca malacologica pp. 1-388, pls 1-5.
 Souverbie, S.M. 1877. Descriptions d'espèces nouvelles de l'Archipel Calédonien. Journal de Conchyliologie 25: 71-76 
 Nevill, G. 1885. Hand List of Mollusca in the Indian Museum, Calcutta. Part 2. Gastropoda. Calcutta : Government Printer pp. 1-306.
 Bartsch, P. 1915. Report on the Turton collection of South African marine mollusks, with additional notes on other South African shells contained in the United States National Museum. United States National Museum Bulletin 91: 1-305, pls 1-54
 Dautzenberg, Ph. (1929). Contribution à l'étude de la faune de Madagascar: Mollusca marina testacea. Faune des colonies françaises, III(fasc. 4). Société d'Editions géographiques, maritimes et coloniales: Paris. 321-636, plates IV-VII 
 Turton, W.H. 1932. The Marine Shells of Port Alfred, South Africa. London : Oxford University Press 331 pp., 70 pls.
 Laseron, C. 1956. The families Rissoinidae and Rissoidae (Mollusca) from the Solanderian and Damperian zoogeographical provinces. Australian Journal of Marine and Freshwater Research 7(3): 384-484 
 Warén A. (1983) An anatomical description of Eulima bilineata Alder with remarks on and a revision of Pyramidelloides Nevill (Mollusca, Prosobranchia, Eulimidae). Zoologica Scripta 12(4): 273-294
  Severns M. (2011) Shells of the Hawaiian Islands - The Sea Shells. Conchbooks, Hackenheim. 564 pp.

External links
 

Eulimidae
Gastropods described in 1861